Herman VIII, Margrave of Baden-Pforzheim was a son of Margrave Herman VII and his wife Agnes of Truhendingen.  From 1291 until his death, he ruled Baden-Pforzheim, the northern part of the Margraviate of Baden, jointly with his brother Rudolf IV.

Margraves of Baden-Pforzheim
Year of birth unknown
1300 deaths
13th-century German nobility